"He Talks to Me" is a song written by Mike Reid and Rory Bourke, and recorded by American country music artist Lorrie Morgan.  It was released in April 1990 as the fifth single from her album Leave the Light On.  The song reached #4 on the Billboard Hot Country Singles & Tracks chart in August 1990.

Chart performance

Year-end charts

References

1990 singles
Lorrie Morgan songs
Songs written by Mike Reid (singer)
Songs written by Rory Bourke
Song recordings produced by Barry Beckett
RCA Records singles
1989 songs